Marie Françoise "Fanny" Bernard (née Martin) (16 September 1819 – 9 October 1901) was the wife of the pioneer in experimental research in physiology, Claude Bernard. She was shocked by his use of vivisection, and created an anti-vivisection society.

Background

Marie Françoise Martin married Claude Bernard on Wednesday 7 May 1845, and it was her dowry from her father, a physician, that allowed him to pursue his studies under François Magendie at the Collège de France in Paris. They had three children—Jeanne-Henriette, Marie-Claude, and a son who died in infancy.

Marie Françoise became opposed to her husband's research methods. Magendie, Claude Bernard and his fellow physiologists—men such as Charles Richet in France and Michael Foster in England—were strongly criticized for the vivisection they carried out on animals, particularly dogs. Anti-vivisectionists infiltrated Magendie's lectures in Paris, where he was dissecting dogs without anaesthetic, allegedly shouting "Tais-toi, pauvre bête!" ("Shut up, you poor beast!") while he worked on them.

She separated from him in 1870,

Arthur de Bretagne
At the age of 19 Claude Bernard wrote a play called Arthur de Bretagne, which was published only after his death. Marie Françoise and her daughters alleged that  it contained a preface that defamed them. They are thought to have sued to have the copies of the play destroyed. However, there was a radio production in 1936, and a second edition appeared in 1943.

Experimental Animals: A Reality Fiction 
In 2016, the American author of experimental literature Thalia Field published Experimental Animals: A Reality Fiction, a thoroughly-researched novel in which she writes about Claude Bernard and the nineteenth-century animal rights movement from the point of view of Marie-Françoise "Fanny" Bernard.

See also
Brown Dog affair
Frances Power Cobbe
Anna Kingsford
Caroline Earle White

Notes

Animal testing
Anti-vivisectionists
French activists
Animal welfare workers
French women activists
1819 births
1901 deaths